The Ccarhuayo District is one of the twelve districts in the Quispicanchi Province in Peru. Created by Law No. 13476 on November 25, 1960, its seat is Ccarhuayo.

Geography 
Other mountains are listed below:

Ethnic groups 
The people in the district are mainly indigenous citizens of Quechua descent. Quechua is the language which the majority of the population (96.69%) learnt to speak in childhood, 3.20% of the residents started speaking using the Spanish language (2007 Peru Census).

References  

  Instituto Nacional de Estadística e Informática. Departamento Cusco. Retrieved on November 1, 2007.